Succisella andreae-molinae is a species of plant in the family Caprifoliaceae. It is endemic to Spain.  Its natural habitat is rivers. It is threatened by habitat loss.

References

Caprifoliaceae
Endemic flora of Spain
Endemic flora of the Iberian Peninsula
Endangered plants
Endangered biota of Europe
Taxonomy articles created by Polbot